Danaë was a 1600-1605 oil on canvas painting by Annibale Carraci, destroyed during World War II. An autograph preparatory study survives in the Royal Collection at Windsor Castle. Prints but no painted copies of it are known.

The earliest reference to the work is a 1652 inventory of the Pamphili family collection. According to Giovanni Pietro Bellori's 1672 Vite de' pittori, scultori e architetti moderni and Scannelli's 1657 Il microcosmo della pittura, Christina of Sweden admired the work on a visit to Camillo Francesco Maria Pamphili's collections and in 1652 he gave it to her. It was then owned by the Odescalchi, but when that collection was split up it became part of the Orléans collection at the Palais Royal in Paris. Like much of the Orléans Collection it was acquired by an English collector and later entered Bridgewater House in London, where it and other Carracci works such as Lamentation were destroyed by bombing in 1941.

Its attribution is accepted by all art historians except Hans Tietze (1880 – 1954) and Donald Posner (1931 – 2005), with the former proposing Domenichino and the latter to Francesco Albani. The composition was a major influence on later treatments of the subject, such as those by Orazio Gentileschi and Rembrandt.

References

Carracci
Mythological paintings by Annibale Carracci
Lost paintings
1605 paintings